Ayala Westgrove Heights is a residential development by Ayala Land located in Silang, Cavite, Philippines.

Ayala Westgrove Heights was founded by Ayala Land in 1998.

Currently, there are two entrances to Ayala Westgrove Heights, via the South Entrance that can be accessed directly from Santa Rosa via South Boulevard and via Acacia Gate near the Laguna Technopark Annex in Biñan, Laguna.

Gallery

References

External links
 Official website

Silang, Cavite
Gated communities in the Philippines
Populated places established in 1988